Access Bank Rwanda is a commercial bank in Rwanda. It is one of the commercial banks licensed by the National Bank of Rwanda, the national banking regulator.

Overview
The bank is a medium-sized financial institution in Rwanda. According to its web site, it is the fourth-largest commercial bank in the country, based on assets. , the bank's total assets were US$83.4 million (RWF:55.8 billion), with shareholders equity of about US$9.72 million (RWF:6.65 billion).

History
Access Bank (Rwanda) PLC is a commercial bank that operates in Rwanda. The bank was officially launched in January, 2009 after fulfilling all regulatory requirements.

Formerly BANCOR SA Rwanda and created in 1995 by foreign investors, the bank was restructured in 2001 after its takeover by Rwandan and South African private investors. Having commenced operations in Kigali, the Bank has since expanded its operations by extending its network to Nyabugogo, Rubavu and Rusizi.

Access Bank Plc, one of the largest banks in Nigeria, officially acquired BANCOR SA after its successful acquisition of a 75% stake. The acquisition by Access Bank Plc has increased the bank's capacity and effectively positioned it to provide total banking solutions to customer needs.

Access Bank Group
Access Bank Rwanda is a member of the Access Bank Group, the sixth largest financial services provider in Nigeria, based on assets. Other member companies of the group include:

 Access Bank plc – Nigeria
 Omnifinance Bank – Ivory Coast
 Banque Privée du Congo – Democratic Republic of the Congo
 Access Bank Rwanda – Rwanda
 Access Bank Sierra Leone – Sierra Leone
 Access Bank Gambia – The Gambia
 Access Bank United Kingdom – United Kingdom
 Access Bank Zambia – Zambia
 Finbank Burundi – Burundi
 Transnational Bank - Kenya

Ownership
The bank's stock is owned by the following corporate entities and private individuals:

Access Bank Rwanda - Branch Network
As of April 2022, the bank maintains branches in the following locations:

 Access Bank Rwanda Head Office  - KN4 Ave, 3rd Floor- KIC Building (Formerly known as UTC Building), Kigali Rwanda
 Remera Branch - Remera, Kigali, Rwanda
 Nyabugogo - Nyarugenge, Kigali, Rwanda
 Rubavu - Rubavu District
 Musanze- Musanze District
 Rusizi - Rusizi District
 CHIC Branch - Kigali, Rwanda
 KICUKIRO / Mt. Meru Station - Kigali, Rwanda

References

External links

 Economy of Rwanda
 List of banks in Rwanda
 Access Bank Rwanda Homepage
 Access Bank Rwanda on Twitter
 Access Bank Rwanda Expands Branch Network
e Finance listing for Access Bank (Nigeria)

Banks of Rwanda
Banks established in 1995
1995 establishments in Rwanda
Economy of Kigali
Organisations based in Kigali
Access Bank Group